William Lawies Jackson, 1st Baron Allerton,  (16 February 1840 – 4 April 1917) was a British businessman and Conservative politician.

Background and education
Born in Otley, near Leeds, England, Jackson was the son of William Jackson, a leather merchant and tanner. He was educated at the Moravian School.

Business career
Jackson took over his father's business. His Times obituary reads, "Early in his commercial career he devoted his energies to tanning, and was prominent in the leather industry." He was also Chairman of the Great Northern Railway.

Political career
Jackson was elected to Leeds Borough Council in 1859. He entered national politics when he unsuccessfully contested Leeds in an 1876 by-election. He was successful in being elected for the same constituency in 1880. He switched to the Northern Division of Leeds in 1885, and he would represent that constituency until he was raised to the peerage in 1902. Jackson served two separate periods as Financial Secretary to the Treasury (1885–1886 and 1886–1891), being created a Privy Counsellor on 30 June 1890. He was then appointed Chief Secretary for Ireland in 1891, serving in that position for one year, although he did not sit in the Cabinet. He was Lord Mayor of Leeds in 1895. In the 1902 Coronation Honours list it was announced that he would receive a barony, and he was raised to the peerage as Baron Allerton, of Chapel Allerton, in the County of York, on 17 July 1902. He took the oath and his seat in the House of Lords a week later, on 21 July. Lord Allerton chaired several institutions before his death on 4 April 1917.

Family
Jackson married Grace, daughter of George Tempest, of Otley, on 10 October 1860. His elder son George succeeded him as Baron Allerton. His younger son Francis Stanley was an international cricketer and had a military and political career. Jackson and his wife Grace were both buried at St Matthew's Church, Chapel Allerton.

Arms

References

Cokayne, G.E., et al. The Complete Peerage. Rpt. in concise form. Gloucester: Alan Sutton, 1982.

External links 

 
 

People from Otley
1840 births
1917 deaths
Conservative Party (UK) MPs for English constituencies
Conservative Party (UK) hereditary peers
Barons in the Peerage of the United Kingdom
Members of the Privy Council of Ireland
Members of the Privy Council of the United Kingdom
Fellows of the Royal Society
UK MPs 1880–1885
UK MPs 1885–1886
UK MPs 1886–1892
UK MPs 1892–1895
UK MPs 1895–1900
UK MPs 1900–1906
UK MPs who were granted peerages
Directors of the Great Northern Railway (Great Britain)
People educated at Fulneck School
Chief Secretaries for Ireland
Peers created by Edward VII